Guzmania berteroniana is a plant species in the genus Guzmania. It is native to Panama, Puerto Rico and the Dominican Republic  but cultivated elsewhere as an ornamental. It can be found in the wild at the Toro Negro State Forest in Ponce, Puerto Rico.

Cultivars
 Guzmania 'Elaine'
 Guzmania Eliane (Elaine)

References

berteroniana
Flora of the Dominican Republic
Flora of Puerto Rico
Flora of Panama
Plants described in 1830
Flora without expected TNC conservation status